Ready Steady Who is the first 7" EP by The Who, released on 11 November 1966, about a month prior to their album A Quick One. The title refers to a Ready Steady Go! TV special the band had recently appeared in, but the EP contains different recordings from those performed on the TV show.

EP profile 
The record consists of two original songs by Pete Townshend, as well as covers of the theme from the Batman TV series and Jan and Dean's "Bucket T". Also included is a cover of The Regents' "Barbara Ann", a song whose famous arrangement by the Beach Boys the Who follows more closely. Despite what the title implies, the EP was not recorded on Ready Steady Go!; it is a studio recording and is unaffiliated with the television show.

All of the songs are available as bonus tracks on the 1995 reissue CD of A Quick One, except for "Circles", which differs from the version on the 2002 deluxe version of the My Generation LP, and can be found on Two's Missing.

The original EP credits the song "Batman" to Jan Berry, Don Altfeld (misspelled as "Altfield") and Fred Weider. The song was actually written by Neal Hefti, and is not a cover of the Jan and Dean-embellished version. The credit was corrected in the liner notes to the 1995 CD release of A Quick One.

An abridged version of "My Generation" was recorded for the EP, but was not included. This version was later included as a bonus track on the 1995 remaster of A Quick One. The main difference between this version and the original is that it is heavily abridged and that the hail of feedback that ends the original serves as a transition into a chaotic rendition of Edward Elgar's "Land of Hope and Glory." In the album's liner notes the song is credited to both Townshend and Elgar.

Release and reception 

The EP was released on 11 November 1966 exclusively in the United Kingdom in mono only. It reached number one on the British EP chart, a position it would hold for four non-consecutive weeks on 17 December 1966, and once again on 7 January 1967.

As the EP was not issued in the United States at the time, the tracks were long considered rare collectibles. Although the tracks "Disguises" and "Bucket 'T'" saw a release on the 1968 compilation album Magic Bus: The Who on Tour, the remainder of the tracks would not see official US releases until the deluxe edition of A Quick One and Two's Missing.

"Bucket 'T'" was released as a single in several European countries. It fared well especially in Sweden, where it stayed on the charts for seven weeks, and peaked at number one for a week in February 1967.

Upon its release, it garnered mixed to positive reviews. In a retrospective review, AllMusic critic Richie Unterberger states that "it seemed undecided as to whether it was a joke cover record, or a home for leftovers" and thought that "it ended up a little bit of both"

Track listing
Side one
"Disguises" (Pete Townshend)3:10
"Circles" (Townshend)2:27

Side two
"Batman" (Jan Berry, Don Altfeld, Fred Weider)1:22
"Bucket 'T (Altfeld, Roger Christian, Dean Torrence)2:07
"Barbara Ann" (Fred Fassert)1:59

References

External links
The Who Official Band Website - Ready Steady Who (EP)
List of The Who singles

1966 debut EPs
Albums produced by Kit Lambert
The Who EPs
Reaction Records EPs